Dilbilmaz (also Romanized as Dīlbīlmaz; also known as Dīl Bīlīmaz) is a village in Baba Jik Rural District, in the Central District of Chaldoran County, West Azerbaijan Province, Iran. At the 2006 census, its population was 60, in 11 families.

References 

Populated places in Chaldoran County